The UAE President's Cup, or simply the President Cup, is a football tournament that takes place in United Arab Emirates, between clubs in the UAE Pro League and the UAE First Division League. The winner qualifies for the AFC Champions League.

History
The UAE President's Cup started in the 1974–75 season, held by United Arab Emirates Football Association. Shabab Al Ahli is the competition's most successful club with ten wins, followed by Sharjah with nine. Al Ain has contested the most finals with fourteen. The first match of the President's Cup, played on March 20, 1974, between Al Wasl, Ajman ended 2–3, Ali Saeed scored the first goal of the competition. Kuwaiti Ghazi Al-Qandi is the first referee to run a final match of the Cup, on April 11, 1975.

Finals

Performance by club

Top scorers

Top scorers by season

All-time top scorers

References

External links

 
Football cup competitions in the United Arab Emirates
National association football cups
Recurring sporting events established in 1974
1974 establishments in the United Arab Emirates